USS Harry W. Hill (DD-986), named for Admiral Harry W. Hill USN, was a  built by the Ingalls Shipbuilding Division of Litton Industries at Pascagoula, Mississippi.

History

In late November 1982 Harry W. Hill was detached from the  battlegroup to shadow the Soviet aircraft carrier Minsk, which was transiting the Indian Ocean for her first deployment to the Far East, a matter of considerable interest to U.S. planners. As such, Enterprise assigned two intelligence specialists to Harry W. Hill to help in tracking the Russians. Harry W. Hill rejoined the battlegroup on 19–20 January 1983.

Harry W. Hill deployed as part of operations Desert Shield and Desert Storm, part of the 1990-1991 Gulf War. On 14 January 1991, she collided with the Wichita class replenishment oiler  while conducting underway replenishment operations in the Gulf of Oman. There were no personnel casualties or injuries reported.

In 1994, Harry W. Hill was significantly damaged during a maneuver to re-float her and exit a dry dock. In the incident, she was caught by a gust of wind which caused the ship to smash into the dry dock. One of the steel wire control lines intended to control the ship parted, seriously injuring two crewmen in the process. The ship sustained damage to her rudders, screws, and controllable prop pitch systems.

Harry W. Hill was the only Spruance-class destroyer not to receive the armored box launchers nor the Mark 41 vertical launch system for firing Tomahawk cruise missiles.

Fate
She was based out of San Diego for much of her career. Harry W. Hill was decommissioned and stricken from the Navy List on 29 May 1998. She was sunk as a target during RIMPAC 2004 on 15 July 2004.

Gallery

See also
List of destroyers of the United States Navy

External links

 
 navsite.de: USS Harry W. Hill 
 Photo Page 1 webpage
 Photo Page 2 webpage

 

Spruance-class destroyers
Cold War destroyers of the United States
Gulf War ships of the United States
Ships built in Pascagoula, Mississippi
1978 ships
Ships sunk as targets
United States Navy ship names